Qibya is a Palestinian village in the West Bank, located  northwest of Ramallah and exactly north of the large Israeli city of Modi'in. It is part of the Ramallah and al-Bireh Governorate, and according to the Palestinian Central Bureau of Statistics, it had a population of approximately 4,901 in 2007.

It is known for the 1953 Qibya massacre.

Location
It is bordered by Ni'lin  to the east, Shuqba  to the north, the Green line  to the west, and Budrus and Ni'lin  to the south.

History
A Bar Kokhba Revolt coin dated to between 134 and 136 was found in a Karst cave near this village, suggesting that Jews who rebelled against the Roman Empire had found refuge in this cave. Potsherds from the Roman/Byzantine, Byzantine Empire, Mamluk and early Ottoman period have been found in the village.

A building, possibly dating to the  Crusader era have been found here.

Ottoman period
Qibya, like the rest of Palestine, was incorporated into the Ottoman Empire in 1517, and in the census of 1596, the village was located in the Nahiya of Ramla of the Liwa of Gaza. It had an entirely Muslim  population of 29 households. They paid a fixed tax rate of 25% on wheat, barley, summer crops, olives, fruit trees, lintels, goats and/or beehives, in addition of taxes for a press for olives or grapes; a total of 6,000 akçe.

In 1882, the PEF's Survey of Western Palestine described the village (then named Kibbiah), as "a very small hamlet with olive-trees, on high ground".

British Mandate period
In the 1922 census of Palestine, conducted by the British Mandate authorities, the village, (named Kibbia),  had a population of 694 inhabitants, all Muslims. In the 1931 census the population of Qibya was 909, still all Muslim, in 204 inhabited houses.

In the 1945 statistics, the population of Qibya was 1,250, all Muslims, who owned 16,504 dunams of land according to an official land and population survey. 4,788 dunams were used for cereals, while 32 dunams were built-up (urban) land.

Jordanian era
In the wake of the 1948 Arab–Israeli War, and after the 1949 Armistice Agreements, Qibya came under Jordanian rule.

Massacre

In October 1953 Qibya was the target of an Israeli raid known as the Qibya massacre by Unit 101 commanded by Ariel Sharon which resulted in the death of 67 or 69 unarmed civilians and large-scale destruction of the village. On October 18, 1953, the U.S. State Department issued a bulletin expressing its "deepest sympathy for the families of those who lost their lives" in Qibya as well as the conviction that those responsible "should be brought to account and that effective measures should be taken to prevent such incidents in the future." The United States temporarily suspended economic aid to Israel.

The Jordanian census of 1961 found 1,635 inhabitants in Qibya.

Post-1967
Since the Six-Day War in 1967, Qibya  has been under Israeli occupation. 

After the 1995 accords, 21.5% of Qibya land was classified as Area B, the remaining 78.5% as Area C. Israel has  confiscated land from Qibya in order to construct the Israeli West Bank barrier.

Qibya received media coverage again in the run-up to the 2001 Israeli general election when it was correctly forecast that Sharon would become the next Israeli Prime Minister.

References

Bibliography

External links
Welcome To Qibya
Survey of Western Palestine, Map 14:  IAA, Wikimedia commons 
 Qibya Village (Fact Sheet), Applied Research Institute–Jerusalem (ARIJ)
  Qibya Village Profile, (ARIJ)
 Qibya aerial photo, (ARIJ)
 Locality Development Priorities and Needs in Qibya Village,  (ARIJ)
Israel illegally Re delineate the boundaries of the Palestinian Villages! The case of Qibya and Budrus villages 17, October, 2005
Halt-of-Construction orders hit Palestinian structures in the village of Qibya in Ramallah Governorate 23, December, 2010
UN 

Villages in the West Bank
Ramallah and al-Bireh Governorate
Municipalities of the State of Palestine